Vitalija Bartkuvienė  (27 June 1939 – 29 August 1996) was a Lithuanian painter.

See also
List of Lithuanian painters

References
This article was initially translated from the Lithuanian Wikipedia.

1939 births
1996 deaths
20th-century Lithuanian painters